Imran Haider (born 31 October 1987) is a Pakistani-born cricketer who played for the United Arab Emirates national cricket team. He made his List A debut for the United Arab Emirates cricket team in their three-match series against Oman in October 2016.

He made his Twenty20 International (T20I) debut for the United Arab Emirates against Afghanistan on 18 December 2016. He made his One Day International (ODI) debut for the United Arab Emirates against Scotland on 24 January 2017. He made his first-class debut on 7 April 2017 against Papua New Guinea in the 2015–17 ICC Intercontinental Cup.

In January 2018, he was named in the United Arab Emirates' squad for the 2018 ICC World Cricket League Division Two tournament. In August 2018, he was named in the United Arab Emirates' squad for the 2018 Asia Cup Qualifier tournament. In December 2018, he was named in the United Arab Emirates' team for the 2018 ACC Emerging Teams Asia Cup.

In September 2019, he was named in the United Arab Emirates' squad for the 2019 ICC T20 World Cup Qualifier tournament in the UAE.

References

External links
 

1987 births
Living people
Emirati cricketers
United Arab Emirates One Day International cricketers
United Arab Emirates Twenty20 International cricketers
Cricketers from Lahore
Pakistani emigrants to the United Arab Emirates
Pakistani expatriate sportspeople in the United Arab Emirates